The Trixy G 4-2 R ("Gyro For Two powered by Rotax") is an Austrian autogyro, designed and produced by Trixy Aviation Products of Dornbirn. The aircraft was introduced at the Aero show held in Friedrichshafen in 2011 and when it was available it was supplied as a complete ready-to-fly-aircraft.

Design and development
The G 4-2 R features a single main rotor, a two-seats-in tandem enclosed cockpit, tricycle landing gear and a four-cylinder, air and liquid-cooled, four-stroke, dual-ignition  Rotax 912S engine in pusher configuration. The  ULPower UL260i powerplant is optional.

The aircraft fuselage is made with a stainless steel tube frame; the cockpit is formed from carbon fibre. Its  diameter two-bladed aluminium Averso rotor employs a NACA 8H12 airfoil and has a 1500-hour time between overhauls. For safety the  fuel tank incorporates ME Rin anti-explosion technology. A second fuel tank of the same capacity can be optionally added. Baggage capacity is two  compartments.

Even though the manufacturer is an Austrian company the aircraft is built in Slovenia. The G 4-2 R was noted by Bayerl et al. in 2011 for its unusual new aircraft two-year warranty.

Specifications (G 4-2 R)

References

External links

2010s Austrian sport aircraft
Single-engined pusher autogyros
Aircraft first flown in 2011
G 4-2 R